Venus with a Mirror (c. 1555) is a painting by Titian, now in the National Gallery of Art in Washington, DC, and it is considered to be one of the collection's highlights.

The pose of the Venus resembles the classical statues of the Venus de' Medici in Florence or the Capitoline Venus in Rome, which Titian may have seen when he wrote that was "learning from the marvelous ancient stones." The painting is said to celebrate the ideal beauty of the female form, or to be a critique of vanity, or perhaps both. It was copied by several later artists, including Peter Paul Rubens and Anthony van Dyck.

Titian made a number of paintings of the same subject, but this is believed to be the earliest and the only version to be entirely by the hand of Titian, without additions by his assistants. It remained in his house until his death in 1576.

Painting, and versions
X-rays of the painting have revealed that Titian painted it over a double portrait which he had abandoned. Titian kept the red cloak of one of the figures in the abandoned painting and placed it under Venus's arm. The use of the cloak from the earlier painting probably played a large part in the composition of the new painting.

Titian is believed to have made another version of this Venus for the Venetian lawyer Niccolo Crasso, who also commissioned Titian to paint the Retable of Saint Nicholas de Bari at about the same time. A drawing of the other version was included by Anthony van Dyck in the sketchbook made during his trip to Italy. This other version is now lost, but a studio copy exists in the Hermitage Museum.

Titian is thought to have made a second copy, which was sent to his regular patron King Philip II of Spain, in 1567. This version was also lost, but a copy of it by Peter Paul Rubens exists, which is in the Thyssen-Bornemisza Museum in Madrid.

Other versions

Provenance
In 1581, five years after Titian's death, the contents of his house in Venice, including the Venus with a Mirror, were sold by his son and heir Pomponio Vechellio to Christoforo Barbarigo. In 1850 the Russian Consul-General in Venice, A. Kvostov, purchased the painting, along with a large number of other masterpieces, from the Barbarigo family, for Czar Nicholas I for the sum of 525,000 francs, and it entered the collection of the Hermitage Museum in Saint Petersburg.

In 1931, in order to earn foreign currency for the first of the five-year plans for the national economy of the Soviet Union, Joseph Stalin and the Soviet government secretly sold the painting, along with a number of other masterpieces, to a syndicate of art dealers, who sold it to the American collector Andrew Mellon, who wished to create a national art museum for the United States. Mellon donated it to the United States Government in 1937. It was one of the first masterpieces to be displayed in the National Gallery of Art in Washington when it opened in 1941.

Works that may have influenced Titian

The pose of the painting may have been influenced by Ancient Greek and Roman statues of Venus Titian could have seen in Rome and Florence. He was also influenced by his teacher Giovanni Bellini, who was the leader of the Venetian school of painters, known for their masterful use of color.

Influence of the painting
The theme of the painting was adapted by a number of later artists, including Peter Paul Rubens and Diego Velázquez.

The painting itself was the inspiration for the protagonist Severin's imagination in the 1870 novel Venus in Furs by Leopold von Sacher-Masoch.

Gallery, influences

Notes

See also
 List of paintings in the National Gallery of Art, Washington DC, formerly in the Hermitage Museum
 Venus in Furs, a novel containing great reference to the painting.

References

 Humfrey, Peter (2007), Titien, Tout l'oeuvre peint, Ludion, 2007, 
 Nicholas Ilyin and Natalia Semonova, (2000), Prodanniy Sokrovischye Rossiyi, Trilisnik Publishers, Moscow, 

1555 paintings
Collections of the National Gallery of Art
Mythological paintings by Titian
Paintings of Venus
Nude art
Paintings of Cupid
Mirrors in art